The World Figure Skating Championships is an annual figure skating competition sanctioned by the International Skating Union in which figure skaters compete for the title of World Champion.

The 1960 competitions for men, ladies, pair skating, and ice dancing took place from March 1 to 5 in Vancouver, British Columbia, Canada. It was the first time that the participants per country in each category was limited to three. This rule is kept since.

Results

Men

Judges:
 F. Wojtanowskyj 
 E. Lewis 
 Gérard Rodrigues-Henriques 
 Adolf Walker 
 G. S. Yates 
 E. Finsterwald 
 H. G. Storke

Ladies

Judges:
 Martin Felsenreich 
 W. E. Lewis 
 Emil Skákala 
 Gérard Rodrigues-Henriques 
 Theo Klemm 
 Pamela Davis 
 G. De Mori 
 L. Benedict-Stieber 
 H. G. Storke

Pairs

Judges:
 F. Wojtanowskyj 
 W. E. Lewis
 Emil Skákala 
 Theo Klemm 
 Pamela Davis 
 G. De Mori 
 L. Benedict-Stieber 
 E. Finsterwald 
 H. G. Storke

Ice dancing

Judges:
 A. McKechnie 
 Emil Skákala 
 J. Meudec 
 Hermann Schiechtl 
 L. C. Seagrave 
 E. Finsterwald 
 J. R. Shoemaker

References

Sources
 Result List provided by the ISU

World Figure Skating Championships
World Figure Skating Championships
World Figure Skating Championships
International figure skating competitions hosted by Canada
1960 in Canadian sports
1960 in British Columbia
Sports competitions in Vancouver
March 1960 sports events in Canada
1960s in Vancouver